Steven Wyeth is a British football commentator for the BBC and BT Sport amongst others.

Early life
Wyeth attended the University of Manchester and commented on Manchester United for Manchester Sports and for BBC Radio Manchester.

Career

Commentary
Wyeth commentates on the BBC’s flagship football highlights show Match of the Day. For BT Sport Wyeth covers commentary on Champions League, Europa League, Bundesliga and Ligue 1.

Podcasts
Wyeth has a football podcast with Hugh Ferris, Rory Smith, and Andy Hinchcliffe called Set Piece Menu in which the four (a journalist, a commentator, a presenter and an ex-footballer) "discuss football over food". It has been described as ‘intelligent, well-informed and delightfully warm discourse’ by The Football Faithful. Wyeth has also guested on the official UEFA Champions League podcast.

Personal life
Wyeth’s brother David made national headlines at the 2017 London Marathon when he completed in under three hours but had to be helped across the line by a fellow competitor after his legs gave way 200m from the finish line.

References

British association football commentators
Alumni of the University of Manchester
British podcasters
Date of birth missing (living people)
Place of birth missing (living people)
Living people
Year of birth missing (living people)
BBC sports presenters and reporters